The 2020 United States Senate election in Texas was held on November 3, 2020, to elect a member to the United States Senate to represent the State of Texas, concurrently with the 2020 U.S. presidential election, as well as other elections to the United States Senate in other states and elections to the United States House of Representatives and various state and local elections. Incumbent Republican Senator John Cornyn won re-election to a fourth term against Democratic nominee MJ Hegar by 9.6%.

Prior to the election, most news organizations projected this race as "Lean Republican", and was not expected to be as competitive the contest for Texas's other Senate seat two years prior, when Republican incumbent Ted Cruz defeated Democrat Beto O'Rourke by a 2.6% margin. Nonetheless, John Cornyn won in what was his worst performance out of his four elections for the U.S. Senate, while MJ Hegar's 43.9% marked the highest vote share of any of Cornyn's Democratic challengers. Despite this being Cornyn’s worst performance percentage-wise, he more than doubled his 2014 vote count and received the most raw votes for a Republican U.S. Senate candidate in the history of the United States.

Cornyn outperformed President Donald Trump in the state by about 4%, and was able to carry two counties won by Joe Biden (Tarrant and Williamson). While Cornyn did better than Trump in the Texas Triangle, contributing to his over performance, Hegar slightly outperformed Biden in the heavily Hispanic Rio Grande Valley, and was able to carry one Trump county (Zapata), though Hegar herself vastly underperformed previous Democratic margins in the region.

Republican primary

Candidates

Nominee
John Cornyn, incumbent U.S. Senator

Eliminated in the primary
 Virgil Bierschwale, U.S. Navy veteran, software developer, realtor
John Anthony Castro, attorney, author, businessman, entrepreneur
Dwayne Stovall, bridge construction contractor, businessman
Mark Yancey, businessman, Attacca International Executive, former owner of the Dallas Wings basketball team

Declined
Pat Fallon, state senator
 Dan Patrick, Lieutenant Governor of Texas (endorsed John Cornyn)
Allen West, former U.S. Representative for Florida's 22nd congressional district (running for state party chair)

Endorsements

Polling

Results

Democratic primary

Candidates

Nominee
MJ Hegar, retired United States Air Force Major, businesswoman, author, teacher, and Democratic Party nominee for Texas's 31st congressional district in 2018

Eliminated in the runoff
 Royce West, state senator, former President Pro Tempore of the Texas Senate, attorney

Eliminated in the primary
Cristina Tzintzún Ramirez, labor organizer and author
Annie "Mamá" Garcia, attorney, small-business owner, and non-profit founder
Amanda Edwards, Houston City Councillor
Chris Bell, former U.S. Representative for Texas's 25th congressional district, nominee for Governor of Texas in 2006 and candidate for Mayor of Houston in 2015
Sema Hernandez, organizer for the Poor People's Campaign and candidate for the U.S. Senate in 2018
Michael Cooper, pastor and candidate for Lieutenant Governor of Texas in 2018
Victor Hugo Harris, U.S. Army Reserve Colonel
Adrian Ocegueda, financial analyst and candidate for Governor of Texas in 2018
Jack Daniel Foster Jr., educator
D. R. Hunter, retiree

Withdrawn
John B. Love III, Midland City Councillor
Hunter Darrel Reece
David Selig

Declined
Joaquín Castro, incumbent U.S. Representative for Texas's 20th congressional district
Julián Castro, former United States Secretary of Housing and Urban Development, former Mayor of San Antonio and former 2020 presidential candidate
 Beto O'Rourke, former U.S. Representative for Texas's 16th congressional district, nominee for the U.S. Senate in 2018 and former 2020 presidential candidate

Endorsements

First round

Debates

Polling

Results

Runoff

Polling

Debates 

with MJ Hegar and Chris Bell

with MJ Hegar and Amanda Edwards

with MJ Hegar and Cristina Tzintzún Ramirez

Results

Other candidates

Libertarian Party

Candidates

Nominee
 Kerry McKennon, Libertarian nominee for Lieutenant Governor of Texas in 2018

Withdrawn
 Wes Benedict, former national Executive Director of the Libertarian Party
 Rhett Rosenquest Smith, Libertarian nominee for the Precinct 2 Bexar County Justice of the Peace in 2020 and Libertarian nominee for Texas's 11th congressional district in  2018

Green Party

Nominee
 David B. Collins, info tech trainer and Green nominee for U.S. Senate in 2012

People Over Politics Party

Withdrawn
 Cedric Jefferson

Human Rights Party

Withdrawn
 James Brumley

Independents

Declared
 Ricardo Turullols-Bonilla, retired teacher and candidate for Austin city council in 2014 (as a write-in candidate)

Withdrawn
 Tim Smith
 Arjun Srinivasan
 Krisjiannis Vittato, teacher and ex-filmmaker

General election

Debate

Predictions

Endorsements

Polling

Graphical summary

Aggregate polls

with Royce West

with Chris Bell

with Sema Hernandez

with Beto O'Rourke

with generic Democrat

with generic Opponent

with generic Republican and generic Democrat

Results 

Counties that flipped from Democratic to Republican
 Frio (largest municipality: Pearsall)
 Jim Wells (largest municipality: Alice)
Counties that flipped from Republican to Democratic
 Bexar (largest municipality: San Antonio)
 Culberson (largest municipality: Van Horn)
 Fort Bend (largest municipality: Sugar Land)
 Harris (largest municipality: Houston)
 Hays (largest municipality: San Marcos)

See also
 2020 Texas elections

Notes
Partisan clients

Additional candidates and voter samples

References

Further reading

External links
Elections Division at the Texas Secretary of State official website

 
 
 
  (State affiliate of the U.S. League of Women Voters)
 

Official campaign websites
 John Cornyn (R) for Senate
 MJ Hegar (D) for Senate
 Kerry McKennon (L) for Senate 
 Ricardo Turullols-Bonilla (I) for Senate

2020
Texas
United States Senate